The 141-Class Locomotive is a powerful metre gauge steam locomotive in use on Vietnamese Railways. Mechanically they are very similar to Vietnamese 231-500 Class Locomotives.

History 
The first variants of the 141-1 class locomotives were produced by the Société Alsacienne de Construction Mecaniques (SACM) in Mulhouse between 1947 and 1950. An order for 27 (an additional order for 17 was reduced to 8 in 1951) locomotives was placed for the French Indochinese colonies before the partition of North and South Vietnam. Both nations would continue to use the French 141-Class into the 1970s.

In 1965 the North built two domestic locomotives using disassembled French models and spare parts. These were dubbed the 'Tu Luc' or 'self-reliant' class. The engines were built by Gia Lam Ironworks in Hanoi. More locomotives were planned, but the escalation of the Vietnamese War forces production to move to China. The Chinese class of locomotives, the Zi Li (Unaided or self-reliant,) was an almost identical copy of the French and Vietnamese locomotives, but were slightly lighter.

Preserved examples
141-158: Saigon station
141-179: Vinh Railway Station
141-182: Di An Works
141-206: Da Nang Railway Station

References

2-8-2 locomotives
Railway locomotives introduced in 1947
Steam locomotives of Vietnam